The National Women's Football Association (NWFA) was a full-contact American football league for women headquartered in Nashville, Tennessee. The league was founded by Catherine Masters in 2000, as the two benchmark teams, the Alabama Renegades and the Nashville Dream played each other six times in exhibition games. The opening season was in 2001 featuring ten teams. The NWFA did not officially field any teams for the 2009 season.

The NWFA was originally called the National Women's Football League, but changed its name after the 2002 season. The name change came after pressure from the National Football League. The NFL also required the league to change the logos of some teams whose logos resembled those of NFL teams.

League founder Catherine Masters was inducted into the American Football Association's Semi Pro Football Hall of Fame in 2006.

League rules
NWFA teams played according to standard National Football League rules with the following notable exceptions:

 TDY-sized football
 only one foot in-bounds is required for a reception
 no blocking below the waist downfield

List of teams

 IWFL = Independent Women's Football League
 WFA = Women's Football Alliance
 WSFL = Women's Spring Football League

Championship games
2001 Philadelphia Liberty Belles 40, Pensacola Power 7
2002 Detroit Danger 48, Massachusetts Mutiny 30
2003 Detroit Demolition 28, Pensacola Power 21
2004 Detroit Demolition 52, Oklahoma City Lightning 0
2005 Detroit Demolition 74, Pensacola Power 0
2006 D.C. Divas 28, Oklahoma City Lightning 7
2007 Pittsburgh Passion 32, Columbus Comets 0
2008 H-Town Texas Cyclones 39, West Michigan Mayhem 10

See also
Women's Football in the United States
List of leagues of American football
Women's National Basketball Association

References

External links
 American Football Association

 
Women's American football leagues
2000 establishments in the United States
2008 disestablishments in the United States
Sports leagues established in 2000
Sports leagues disestablished in 2008